"Beautiful Stranger" is a 1999 single by Madonna.

Beautiful Stranger may also refer to:

Film and television
A Beautiful Stranger (Piękna nieznajoma), a 1992 Polish film by Jerzy Hoffman
Beautiful Stranger, an alternate title for the 1954 mystery film Twist of Fate
Beautiful Strangers (TV series), a Philippine television series

Books
Beautiful Stranger, a 2001 novel by Heather Graham Pozzessere and Carla Cassidy
Beautiful Strangers, a 2004 prose collection by the Romanian writer Mircea Cărtărescu
Beautiful Stranger (Zoey Dean novel), a 2007 novel by Zoey Dean
The Beautiful Stranger: The Rogues of Regent Street, a 2008 novel by Julia London
Beautiful Stranger, the sequel to the 2013 novel Beautiful Bastard by Christina Lauren

Music
 "Beautiful Stranger", a song by Nivek Ogre and Briana Evigan in the 2012 musical film The Devil's Carnival
 "Beautiful Stranger", a song from the 2012 EP "Electric Shock" by f(x)
 "Beautiful Stranger", a song from the 2011 album Girls' Generation by Girls' Generation
 "Beautiful Stranger", a 1961 song by Titus Turner Bob Hilliard, and Milt De Lugg
 "Beautiful Strangers", a 2016 song by Kevin Morby

See also
 "Finally // Beautiful Stranger", a 2019 promotional single by Halsey